Poirier Sport & Leisure Complex is a 190,000-square-foot multi-purpose all-season recreation complex in Coquitlam, British Columbia.

Arena
The arena-side of the facility is used by a wide variety of groups, including hockey, lacrosse and ringette teams and figure skaters for hosting national tournaments.

The facility has three playing surfaces. The main arena features an NHL standard 200' x 85' playing surface with seating for 2,200 spectators. An annex provides an additional 200' x 85' playing surface and a six sheet curling rink.

The facility is home to the Coquitlam Sports Hall of Fame, as well as the Coquitlam Express of the British Columbia Hockey League, the Coquitlam Adanacs of the Western Lacrosse Association and the Coquitlam Adanacs of the BC Junior A Lacrosse League.

Pool
The pool-side of the facility includes:
 25 metre main swimming pool
 20 metre warm lap pool
 Leisure pool, including:
 Wheelchair ramp entry
 Lazy river
 Therapy spray
 Tot bubblers, spray arches, belle sprays, and geysers
 1 metre and 3 metre competition diving boards
 Hot tub
 Dry sauna
 Steam room
 Weight/fitness room

Expansion and renovation
In 2010, the old Coquitlam Sports Centre underwent a $62 million expansion and renovation:

 Expansion of main arena, with the ice surface extended to the NHL standard length of 200 feet
 Replacement of the recreational arena
 Replacement of the curling rink
 Lobby improvements to integrate the facility with the aquatic and fitness centre
 New restrooms, concession areas, dressing rooms, and administration areas

Energy efficiency
The facility has been built according to the Leadership in Energy and Environmental Design Silver Standard, including:
 Solar water heating
 Rainwater retention and reuse for landscaping
 Landscaping with native species
 Use of recycled content and non-toxic building products

References

External links
 Poirier Sport & Leisure Complex at the City of Coquitlam web site
 Satellite view of the Coquitlam Sports Centre on Google Maps

Sports venues in Coquitlam
Indoor arenas in British Columbia
Indoor ice hockey venues in Canada
Indoor lacrosse venues in Canada
Swimming venues in British Columbia